The Teluk Bintuni class, Indonesian designation AT-117M is a class of tank landing ships that is being built indigenously for the Indonesian Navy by various Indonesian local shipyards. It was announced that the Indonesian Navy intends to acquire a total of twelve vessels of the same class with some modifications from the lead ship to improve ship's capability.

Characteristics
She has a capacity of 476 passengers, including crew, alongside 10 Leopard 2 main battle tanks and a helicopter. The ship was designed to be able to stay at sea for 20 days. The ship is armed with light defensive weapons in form of a Bofors 40 mm gun and two 12.7 mm heavy machine guns. The vessel could also carry four LCVP boats, and is equipped with a crane for cargo loading and offloading.

Ships

Operational history
In January 2018, during a naval landing exercise at the Berhala Strait, Teluk Bintuni received a signal from a tugboat which was being hijacked by pirates. The vessel launched an LCVP and apprehended the hijackers. She later brought supplies to areas affected by the 2018 Sulawesi earthquake and tsunami.

In August 2019, Teluk Lada was dispatched to rescue hostages aboard MV Mina Sejati, a 36-crew squid fishing vessel which was hijacked by several members of her own crew off Tual, Maluku. Mina Sejati was later discovered empty by Teluk Lada, with eleven survivors testifying that three of the crew had massacred the others.

References

 
Amphibious warfare vessels of the Indonesian Navy
Amphibious warfare vessel classes